The lifetime of British writer, philosopher, and feminist Mary Wollstonecraft (1759–1797) encompassed most of the second half of the eighteenth century, a time of great political and social upheaval throughout Europe and America: political reform movements in Britain gained strength, the American colonists successfully rebelled, and the French Revolution erupted. Wollstonecraft experienced only the headiest of these days, not living to see the end of the democratic revolution when Napoleon crowned himself emperor. Although Britain was still revelling in its mid-century imperial conquests and its triumph in the Seven Years' War, it was the French revolution that defined Wollstonecraft's generation. As poet Robert Southey later wrote: "few persons but those who have lived in it can conceive or comprehend what the memory of the French Revolution was, nor what a visionary world seemed to open upon those who were just entering it. Old things seemed passing away, and nothing was dreamt of but the regeneration of the human race."

Part of what made reform possible in Britain in the second half of the eighteenth century was the dramatic increase in publishing; books, periodicals, and pamphlets became much more widely available than they had been just a few decades earlier. This increase in available printed material helped facilitate the rise of the British middle class. Reacting against what they viewed as aristocratic decadence, the new professional middle classes (made prosperous through British manufacturing and trade), offered their own ethical code: reason, meritocracy, self-reliance, religious toleration, free inquiry, free enterprise, and hard work. They set these values against what they perceived as the superstition and unreason of the poor and the prejudices, censorship, and self-indulgence of the rich. They also helped establish what has come to be called the "cult of domesticity", which solidified gender roles for men and women. This new vision of society rested on the writings of Scottish Enlightenment philosophers such as Adam Smith, who had developed a theory of social progress founded on sympathy and sensibility. A partial critique of the rationalist Enlightenment, these theories promoted a combination of reason and feeling that enabled women to enter the public sphere because of their keen moral sense. Wollstonecraft's writings stand at the nexus of all of these changes. Her educational works, such as her children's book Original Stories from Real Life (1788), helped inculcate middle-class values, and her two Vindications, A Vindication of the Rights of Men (1790) and A Vindication of the Rights of Woman (1792), argue for the value of an educated, rational populace, specifically one that includes women. In her two novels, Mary: A Fiction and Maria: or, The Wrongs of Woman, she explores the ramifications of sensibility for women.

The end of the eighteenth century was a time of great hope for progressive reformers such as Wollstonecraft. Like the revolutionary pamphleteer Thomas Paine and others, Wollstonecraft was not content to remain on the sidelines. She sought out intellectual debate at the home of her publisher Joseph Johnson, who gathered leading thinkers and artists for weekly dinners, and she traveled extensively, first to be a part of the French revolution and later to seek a lost treasure ship for her lover in what was then exotic Scandinavia, turning her journey into a travel book, Letters Written in Sweden, Norway, and Denmark. After two complicated and heart-rending affairs with the artist Henry Fuseli and the American adventurer Gilbert Imlay (with whom she had an illegitimate daughter, Fanny Imlay), Wollstonecraft married the philosopher William Godwin, one of the forefathers of the anarchist movement. Together, they had one daughter: Mary Shelley, the author of Frankenstein. Wollstonecraft died at the age of 38 due to complications from this birth, leaving behind several unfinished manuscripts. Today, she is most often remembered for her political treatise A Vindication of the Rights of Woman and is considered a foundational feminist philosopher.

Timeline

1750s

1760s

1770s

1780s

1790s

See also
 Timeline of the French Revolution

References

Literature timelines
Personal timelines